Felipe de Oliveira Conceição (born 9 July 1979), known as Felipe Conceição, is a Brazilian professional football coach and former player who played as a forward.

Playing career
Known as Felipe Tigrão or simply Tigrão as a player, he was a Botafogo youth graduate. Promoted to the first team in 1998, he struggled to make his breakthrough mainly due to injuries, and moved to Juventude in 2002.

In 2004, after an unassuming spell at Belgian side Germinal Beerschot, Tigrão returned to his home country and joined América Mineiro. In 2007, after representing Cabofriense, Portuguesa-RJ and Tupi, he again moved abroad and signed for Vitória de Guimarães in Portugal.

After being rarely used, Tigrão played two clubs on loan during the 2008–09 season: Pontevedra CF and CD Atlético Baleares, both in the Spanish Segunda División B.

Tigrão started the 2010 season with Paulista after terminating his contract with Vitória, and subsequently represented Liaoning Whowin and Cabofriense before retiring in 2011, aged 32.

Managerial career

On 3 August of that year, after winning the Carioca Série C, he returned to his first club Botafogo, being appointed at the helm of the under-15 squad.

Conceição then returned to Bota, being named third assistant manager; after the appointment of Jair Ventura as manager, he was promoted to the assistant role. On 23 December 2017, he was announced as manager of the first team for the upcoming campaign, replacing Ventura who had left for Santos.

On 10 February 2018, Conceição was sacked from Botafogo; he was offered his previous assistant role, but refused. On 28 March, he took over Macaé, but stepped down on 26 June to become Ricardo Drubscky's assistant at América Mineiro.

In May 2019, Conceição became a technical coordinator of América, but on 15 July, after the dismissal of Mauricio Barbieri, he was appointed first team manager. On 22 October, he renewed his contract with the club until December of the following year, but asked to leave the club on 25 January 2020 after accepting an offer from Red Bull Bragantino; he was announced as manager of the latter club two days later.

On 31 August 2020, Conceição was dismissed by Braga following a 3–0 defeat to Fortaleza. He then coached Guarani before taking over Cruzeiro for the 2021 season on 30 January 2021.

Conceição was sacked by Cruzeiro on 9 June 2021, and took over fellow second division side Remo on 1 July. He left the latter on a mutual agreement on 10 November, with only four matches for the end of the campaign.

On 15 December 2021, Conceição was named manager of Chapecoense for the ensuing campaign. The following 13 February, he resigned after accepting an offer from fellow league team Náutico, but was sacked from the latter club on 11 April.

On 18 November 2022, Conceição was named manager of Sampaio Corrêa also in the second division. The following 7 March, he was sacked.

Honours

Manager
São Gonçalo EC
Campeonato Carioca Série C: 2013

Red Bull Bragantino
Campeonato Paulista do Interior: 2020

References

External links
 
 
 

1979 births
Living people
People from Nova Friburgo
Brazilian footballers
Association football forwards
Campeonato Brasileiro Série A players
Campeonato Brasileiro Série B players
Campeonato Brasileiro Série B managers
Campeonato Brasileiro Série D managers
Brazil under-20 international footballers
Brazilian expatriate footballers
Brazilian expatriate sportspeople in Belgium
Brazilian expatriate sportspeople in Portugal
Brazilian expatriate sportspeople in Spain
Brazilian expatriate sportspeople in China
Expatriate footballers in Belgium
Expatriate footballers in Portugal
Expatriate footballers in Spain
Expatriate footballers in China
Brazilian football managers
Botafogo de Futebol e Regatas players
Esporte Clube Juventude players
Tombense Futebol Clube players
América Futebol Clube (MG) players
Associação Desportiva Cabofriense players
Associação Atlética Portuguesa (RJ) players
Tupi Football Club players
Paulista Futebol Clube players
Primeira Liga players
Vitória S.C. players
Chinese Super League players
Liaoning F.C. players
Botafogo de Futebol e Regatas managers
Macaé Esporte Futebol Clube managers
América Futebol Clube (MG) managers
Red Bull Bragantino managers
Guarani FC managers
Cruzeiro Esporte Clube managers
Clube do Remo managers
Associação Chapecoense de Futebol managers
Clube Náutico Capibaribe managers
Sportspeople from Rio de Janeiro (state)
Sampaio Corrêa Futebol Clube managers